Ruslan Ivanovych Levyha (born 31 January 1983, in Kupiansk, Soviet Union) is a Ukrainian football forward.

Career
He played for Persha Liha side FC Naftovyk-Ukrnafta Okhtyrka.

He previously played for Chornomorets in the Ukrainian Premier League, a club he joined in January 2008, FC Tobol of the Kazakhstan Premier League and FK Baku of the Azerbaijan Premier League.

In February 2011, Levyha signed for Azerbaijan Premier League side FK Baku.

Levyha was injured in a road traffic accident on 6 October 2014, which killed his FC Naftovyk-Ukrnafta Assistant Manager Serhiy Zakarlyuka. On 6 March 2020, Levyha was sentenced to 4-years in jail.

References

External links 

Profile on Official Website
Stats on Odessa Football website

Ukrainian footballers
1983 births
Living people
People from Kupiansk
FC Sokol Saratov players
FC Borysfen Boryspil players
FC Vorskla Poltava players
FC Mariupol players
FC Chornomorets Odesa players
FC Tobol players
FC Baku players
FC Olimpik Donetsk players
FC Naftovyk-Ukrnafta Okhtyrka players
FC Solli Plyus Kharkiv players
Ukrainian Premier League players
Ukrainian Amateur Football Championship players
Ukrainian expatriate footballers
Expatriate footballers in Kazakhstan
Expatriate footballers in Azerbaijan
Association football forwards
Ukrainian Cup top scorers
Ukrainian expatriate sportspeople in Kazakhstan
Ukrainian expatriate sportspeople in Azerbaijan
Sportspeople from Kharkiv Oblast